The Ministry of Road Transport and Bridges is a Bangladeshi government ministry which is the apex body for formulation and administration of the rules, regulations and laws relating to road transport, national highways and bridges. It contains two subsidiary divisions within it:

Road Transport and Highways Division
Bridges Division

In contrast to practices in other nations, Bangladesh has four ministries responsible for transportation within the country. They have specific responsibilities, such as:

Road safety: Ministry of Road Transport and Bridges
Civil aviation: Ministry of Civil Aviation and Tourism
Maritime transport: Ministry of Shipping
Rail transport: Ministry of Railways

Organization

Road Transport and Highways Division
Dhaka Transport Coordination Authority
Bangladesh Road Transport Authority
Bangladesh Road Transport Corporation
Roads and Highways Department

Bridges Division
Bangladesh Bridge Authority

See also 

 Minister of Road Transport and Bridges

References
 Department of Roads and Highways Job Circular 2021 (সড়ক ও জনপদ অধিদপ্তর) (Bangla)

 
Road Transport and Bridges
Road transport in Bangladesh
Bangladesh